Pfeffer's reed snake, Calamaria pfefferi, is a species of dwarf snake in the family Colubridae. The species is  endemic to Japan.

Etymology
The specific name, pfefferi, is in honor of German zoologist Georg Johann Pfeffer.

Geographic range
C. pfefferi is found on Miyako-jima and Irabu-jima in the Ryukyu Islands of Japan.

Habitat
The preferred habitats of C. pfefferi are grassland and forest.

Reproduction
C. pfefferi is oviparous.

References

Further reading
Stejneger L (1901). "Diagnosis of Eight New Batrachians and Reptiles from the Riu Kiu Archipelago, Japan". Proc. Biol. Soc. Washington 14: 189–191. (Calamaria pfefferi, new species, p. 191).
Stejneger L (1907). Herpetology of Japan and Adjacent Territory. United States National Museum Bulletin 58. Washington, Dictrict of Columbia: Smithsonian Institution. xx + 577 pp. (Calamaria pfefferi, pp. 378–380, Figures 313–316).

Endemic reptiles of Japan
Calamaria
Reptiles described in 1901
Taxa named by Leonhard Stejneger
Taxonomy articles created by Polbot